The Portuguese Roller Hockey Cup is a Portuguese roller hockey knockout competition open to all domestic clubs. Following a series of knockout rounds, the competition winner is determined in a final-four mini-tournament, held in a neutral venue at the end of the season. The winners play in the following season's edition of the CERS Cup, unless they have already qualified for the CERH European League via league placing.

Winners

Wins by club

References

Cup
Cup